Lacaba is a surname. Notable people with the surname include:
Emmanuel Lacaba (1948–1976), Filipino writer
Pete Lacaba (born 1945), Filipino screenwriter